Tiger Creek is a stream in Polk County, Florida, in the United States.

Tiger Creek was named from the fact Florida panthers were seen there by early settlers.

References
Florida#USA

Rivers of Polk County, Florida
Rivers of Florida